Valerio Profondavalle, or Valerio Diependale, (1533 – c. 1600) was a Flemish historical painter of the Renaissance period, born in Leuven, but active in Italy. He lived for some time at Florence, and afterwards settled at Milan. His daughter, Prudenzia, painted still-life and historical subjects. Their real name was Diependale, and they belonged to a famous glass-painting family in Leuven of the 15th and 16th centuries.

References

1533 births
Artists from Leuven
16th-century Italian painters
Italian male painters
16th-century Flemish painters
Flemish Renaissance painters
Year of death unknown